Dusty Star Mountain is located in the Lewis Range, Glacier National Park in the U.S. state of Montana. Connected by an arête to Citadel Mountain to the south, Dusty Star Mountain lies to the south and across the Saint Mary Valley from Going-to-the-Sun Mountain. Dusty Star Mountain is easily seen from the Going-to-the-Sun Road, and often photographed by tourists taking pictures of Wild Goose Island which lies in the western section of Saint Mary Lake. The Blackfoot name for Dusty Star is iszika-kakatosi meaning "meteor" or "smoking star".

Geology

Like other mountains in Glacier National Park, it is composed of sedimentary rock laid down during the Precambrian to Jurassic periods.

Climate
Based on the Köppen climate classification, it is located in an alpine subarctic climate zone with long, cold, snowy winters, and cool to warm summers. Winter temperatures can drop below −10 °F with wind chill factors below −30 °F.

See also
 List of mountains and mountain ranges of Glacier National Park (U.S.)

References

External links
 Weather: Dusty Star Mountain

Mountains of Glacier County, Montana
Mountains of Glacier National Park (U.S.)
Lewis Range